Lajos Csontó is a Hungarian artist.

Lajos Csontó was born in Budapest in 1964. He received his printmaker diploma from the Hungarian College of Applied Arts in 1990, and then he continued his studies at the DLA courses. 

In 1992 he received Derkovits Scholarship, in 2007 the Munkácsy Prize.  Currently he is an associate professor at the Esterházy Károly College, and also gives lectures at the Moholy-Nagy University of Art. Many of his works are in public and private collections across Hungary.

In addition to working with traditional graphic and painting techniques, he got involved in photo and video art in the middle of the 1990s. He loves making installations and projects in which the process of creation is part of the work of art. 

His relationship with Miskolc goes back to the beginning of his career. He regularly shows at the Miskolc Graphics Biennials, and has gotten awards as well (1991, 2004). During the spring of 2007, he and Gábor Gerhes presented the irregular exhibition: Special Life - Magic Days with a programme series, involving workshops and screenings. He held a workshop at the Galéria Alkotóház for collage students in 2009. 

Lajos Csontó has been exploring the relationship of the individual and the community, as in the past (the past of a family, the history of personal relationships), in one's immediate environment (family), within a larger community (friends, the profession), under the influence of the global society (advertisements, star idolatry), or amidst the complete indifference of society.

Awards & Grants

 2007 Munkácsy-award
 2006 Scholarship of the Municipal Art Board, Cite Internationale Des Arts, Paris Scholarship of the Hungarian Academy Rome
 2000 Hincz Gyula-award
 1994 The prize of the Magyar Grafikáért Foundation
 1993 The prize of the Fiatal Képzőművészek Stúdiója
 1992-1995 Derkovits-scholarship
 1992 The prize of the Művelődési Minisztérium, VIII. Esztergom Photo Biennal
 1991 The prize of the Művészeti Alap, XVI. National Graphic Biennal, the prize of the Miskolc Fotóművészek Szövetsége, National Photo Biennal
 1986-1992 Hungarian College of Fine Arts, duplicating graphics major

Exhibitions

2009 Selected, Raiffeisen Gallery, Budapest;
2009 Lajos Csontó's exhibition, Líceum Gallery, Eger
2009 Viennafair, Inda Gallery, Vienna;
2009 Janco Dada Museum, Ein Hod, Israel
2008 Treaspassing (with Csurka Eszter and Kamen Stoyanov), Inda Gallery, Budapest
2008 Common Denominator, Kunsthalle - Dorottya Gallery, Budapest
2007 Literature, Budapest Gallery, Lajos Street Exhibition House, Budapest
2007 Bud, (with Imre Bukta) Synagoge, Eger
2006 Knit one, knit purl, Cellar Gallery of Vajda Lajos Studio, Szentendre
2006 One Shape is like the Other, Danube Museum, Europe Central Gallery, Esztergom
2006 Human-smithing, MG Gallery, Budapest
2005 Anti-matter, Picture Gallery of Szentendre, Szentendre
2005 Not enough yet, Kunsthalle, Budapest
2004 The music is beautiful, Centre of Arts, Pécs
2004 One-two, Vintage Gallery, Budapest
2004 Bath-projekt, Sofia Public Mineral Baths, Sofia
2003 Reflexinger, Kunsthalle, Budapest
2003 Kortárs Fotó, Pécsi Gallery, Pécs
2002 Restart, Vintage Gallery, Budapest
2000 You Misunderstood Me, But That's Your Job, French Institute, Budapest
2000 Display, Vintage Gallery, Budapest
1999 Mindent értek apa, Vintage Gallery, Budapest
1998 My God' V.M.K. Photo Gallery, Nyíregyháza
1997 Photographies, Miskolc Photo Gallery, Miskolc
1996 Euphoria, Winter Gallery, Szentendre
1994 Gallery by Night, (with Imre Gábor) Studio Gallery, Budapest
1994 Galerie mladych U Recickych, Prague (with Endre Koronczi, Dvoøák Roman)

References

External links
 http://www.artfacts.net/en/artist/lajos-csonto-59837/profile.html
 http://www.indagaleria.hu/en/artists/csonto-lajos
 http://www.artknowledgenews.com/Dorottya_Gallery.html
 Profile at the Foundation for the Hungarian Photography

Hungarian artists
1964 births
Living people